Neobidessodes is a genus of predaceous diving beetles in the family Dytiscidae. There are about 10 described species in Neobidessodes.  They are found in Australasia. The genus was first described in 2009, and the type species is N. denticulatus.

Species
These 10 species belong to the genus Neobidessodes:
 Neobidessodes bilita (Watts, 1978)
 Neobidessodes darwiniensis Hendrich & Balke, 2011
 Neobidessodes denticulatus (Sharp, 1882)
 Neobidessodes flavosignatus (Zimmermann, 1922)
 Neobidessodes grossus (Zimmermann, 1922)
 Neobidessodes gutteridgei (Watts & Humphreys, 2003)
 Neobidessodes limestoneensis (Watts & Humphreys, 2003)
 Neobidessodes mjobergi (Zimmermann, 1922)
 Neobidessodes samkrisi Hendrich & Balke, 2009
 Neobidessodes thoracicus Hendrich & Balke, 2009

References

Further reading

 
 
 

Dytiscidae